Bronwen Cowie is a New Zealand academic. As of 2018, she is a full professor at the University of Waikato.

Academic career

After a 2000 PhD titled  'Formative assessment in science classrooms'  at the University of Waikato, Cowie joined the staff, rising to full professor.

Selected works 
 Bell, Beverley, and Bronwen Cowie. "The characteristics of formative assessment in science education." Science education 85, no. 5 (2001): 536–553.
 Cowie, Bronwen, and Beverley Bell. "A model of formative assessment in science education." Assessment in Education: Principles, Policy & Practice 6, no. 1 (1999): 101–116.
 Bell, Beverley, Nigel Bell, and B. Cowie. Formative assessment and science education. Vol. 12. Springer Science & Business Media, 2001.
 Cowie, Bronwen. "Pupil commentary on assessment for learning." Curriculum Journal 16, no. 2 (2005): 137–151.
 Cowie, Bronwen, and Margaret Carr. "The consequences of socio-cultural assessment." Early childhood education: Society and culture (2004): 95–106.

References

External links
 
 
 

Living people
New Zealand women academics
University of Waikato alumni
Academic staff of the University of Waikato
New Zealand educational theorists
Year of birth missing (living people)